is a retired male long-distance runner from Japan who mainly competed in the marathon race during his career. He set his personal best (2:08:45) in the classic distance on February 4, 2001 in Ōita.

Achievements

External links

1977 births
Living people
Japanese male long-distance runners
Komazawa University alumni
Japanese male marathon runners
Universiade medalists in athletics (track and field)
Universiade silver medalists for Japan
Medalists at the 1999 Summer Universiade